Chad James Buchanan (born August 28, 1993) is an American actor and model. He grew up in Columbus, Ohio.

Television 
He is best known for his role as Hunter Morgan on Star, and has appeared in several television shows including Jane the Virgin, Grey's Anatomy, Mary + Jane, Glee, American Horror Story, and American Horror Stories. He also joined the cast of Marvel's Inhumans.

Modeling career 
Chad is represented by Premium Models in Paris, d'management group in Milan, and NEXT Model Management in Los Angeles.

Filmography

Film

Television

References

External links 

 Chad Buchanan's Twitter

Male actors from Columbus, Ohio
Male models from Ohio
American male television actors
Male actors from Los Angeles
Living people
1993 births
Place of birth missing (living people)